Katarina Džaferović (born 14 July 2002) is a Montenegrin handball player for ŽRK Budućnost Podgorica and the Montenegrin national team.

She was selected as part of the Montenegrin squad for the 2020 European Women's Handball Championship.

Achievements
Montenegrin Championship:
Winner: 2019, 2021, 2022
Montenegrin Cup:
Winner: 2019, 2020, 2021
Women's Regional Handball League:
Winner: 2019

References

External links

2002 births
Living people
Montenegrin female handball players
Sportspeople from Podgorica